The 1878 Maldon by-election was fought on 11 December 1878.  The by-election was fought due to the resignation of the incumbent Conservative MP, George Sandford.  It was won by the Liberal candidate George Courtauld.

References

1878 in England
Politics of Maldon District
1878 elections in the United Kingdom
By-elections to the Parliament of the United Kingdom in Essex constituencies
1870s in Essex